Lens (French: Gare de Lens) is a railway station in Lens, Pas-de-Calais, France. The building was built in 1926–1927 to resemble a steam locomotive with a  tower as the chimney. The architect was Urbain Cassan. In December 1984 it was listed as a French National Heritage Site (Monument historique).

Services

The station is served by high speed trains to Paris and regional trains to Lille, Douai, Arras, Béthune, Calais and Dunkerque.

References

Lens
Railway stations in France opened in 1927
Monuments historiques of Pas-de-Calais
Lens, Pas-de-Calais